Ilim College, formerly known as Islamic College North Western Region, was established in 1995 to provide Islamic education. Ilim College is a prep to year 12 VCE co-educational, private Islamic school. It is located in Dallas, Victoria, Australia. 

They recently purchased the Yorolla school on Box Forest Rd, Glenroy as an extension campus. A campus in Doveton was purchased by 2014. The school is owned by the non-profit organisation Millî Görüş, which aims at catering for the religious, educational, cultural and social needs of the Muslim community.

References

Islamic schools in Australia
Private secondary schools in Melbourne
Private primary schools in Melbourne
Educational institutions established in 1995
1995 establishments in Australia
Buildings and structures in the City of Hume